Björn Schröder (born 9 August 1968) is a German and Swiss curler and curling coach.

Teams

Men's

Mixed

Record as a coach of national teams

References

External links
 
 Video: 

Living people
1968 births
Swiss male curlers
German male curlers
World curling champions
Swiss curling champions
Swiss curling coaches